Mytilus trossulus, the bay mussel or foolish mussel, is a medium-sized edible marine bivalve mollusc in the family Mytilidae.

Mytilus trossulus is one of the three principal, closely related taxa in the Mytilus edulis complex of blue mussels, which collectively are widely distributed on the temperate to subarctic coasts the Northern Hemisphere, and often are dominant inhabitants on hard substrates of the intertidal and nearshore habitats.

Distribution
Mytilus trossulus is the main native intertidal mussel in the Northern Pacific. In North America it is found from California to Alaska, and in Asia from Hokkaido northwards.   At its southern limits, it hybridizes with Mytilus galloprovincialis (the Mediterranean mussel), which has been introduced to the Pacific by human activity.

In the North Atlantic, M. trossulus is found on the U.S. coast of Maine and northwards to Canada, as well as in scattered localities on North European coasts. In these regions it often coexists and hybridizes with Mytilus edulis.  The entire Baltic Sea is inhabited by a peculiar population of Mytilus trossulus, which shows some genetic introgression from M. edulis and whose mitochondrial DNA has been replaced by M. edulis mtDNA.

In the Arctic, Mytilus trossulus is found in northwest Greenland where they are found scattered in the intertidal zone from 71°N to 77°N

References

trossulus
Molluscs of the Atlantic Ocean
Molluscs of the Pacific Ocean
Marine molluscs of Asia
Marine molluscs of North America
Molluscs of Japan
Molluscs of the United States
Western North American coastal fauna
Fauna of California
Fauna of the Baltic Sea
Bivalves of Asia
Fauna of the Northwestern United States
Bivalves described in 1850
Taxa named by Augustus Addison Gould